Fawn River may refer to the following places:

In Canada:
 Fawn River (Ontario)

In the United States:
 Fawn River (Michigan)
 Fawn River Township, Michigan

See also
 Fawn (disambiguation)